Eurysticta coolawanyah is a species of damselfly in the family Isostictidae,
commonly known as a Pilbara pin. 
It is endemic to the Pilbara region in Western Australia, where it inhabits pools in rivers.

Eurysticta coolawanyah is a pale brown, small to medium-sized damselfly.

Gallery

See also
 List of Odonata species of Australia

References 

Isostictidae
Odonata of Australia
Insects of Australia
Endemic fauna of Australia
Taxa named by J.A.L. (Tony) Watson
Insects described in 1969
Damselflies